The Dytiscidae – based on the Greek dytikos (δυτικός), "able to dive" – are the predaceous diving beetles, a family of water beetles. They occur in virtually any freshwater habitat around the world, but a few species live among leaf litter. Most are dark brown, blackish, or dark olive in color with golden highlights in some subfamilies. The larvae are commonly known as water tigers due to their voracious appetite. They have short, but sharp mandibles and immediately upon biting, they deliver digestive enzymes into prey to suck their liquefied remains. The family includes more than 4,000 described species in numerous genera.

Habitat 
Diving beetles are the most diverse beetles in the aquatic environment and can be found in almost every kind of freshwater habitat, from small rock pools to big lakes. Some dytiscid species are also found in brackish water. Diving beetles live in water bodies in various landscapes, including agricultural and urban landscapes. Some species, such as Agabus uliginosus  and Acilius canaliculatus, are found to be relatively tolerant to recent urbanization. One of the most important limiting factors for diving beetle occurrence is the presence of fish, which predate on the beetles (mostly on larvae), compete for food, and change the structure of the habitat.

Larvae and development 

When still in larval form, the beetles vary in size from about 1 to 5 cm (0.5 to 2.0 in). The larval bodies are shaped like crescents, with the tail long and covered with thin hairs. Six legs protrude from along the thorax, which also sports the same thin hairs. The head is flat and square, with a pair of long, large pincers. When hunting, they cling to grasses or pieces of wood along the bottom, and hold perfectly still until prey passes by, then they lunge, trapping their prey between their front legs and biting down with their pincers. The larvae are also known to partially consume prey and discard the carcass if another potential prey swims nearby. Their usual prey includes tadpoles and glassworms, among other smaller water-dwelling creatures. As the larvae mature, they crawl from the water on the sturdy legs, and bury themselves in the mud for pupation. After about a week, or longer in some species, they emerge from the mud as adults. Adult diving beetles have been found to oviposit their eggs within frog spawn in highly ephemeral habitats, with their eggs hatching within 24 hours after the frogs and the larvae voraciously predating on the recently hatched tadpoles.

Edibility
Adult Dytiscidae, particularly of the genus Cybister, are edible. Remnants of C. explanatus were found in prehistoric human coprolites in a Nevada cave, likely sourced from the Humboldt Sink. In Mexico, C. explanatus is eaten roasted and salted to accompany tacos. In Japan, C. japonicus has been used as food in certain regions such as Nagano prefecture. In the Guangdong Province of China, the latter species, as well as C. bengalensis, C. guerini, C. limbatus, C. sugillatus, C. tripunctatus, and probably also the well-known great diving beetle (D. marginalis) are bred for human consumption, though as they are cumbersome to raise due to their carnivorous habit and have a fairly bland (though apparently not offensive) taste and little meat, this is decreasing. Dytiscidae are reportedly also eaten in Taiwan, Thailand, and New Guinea.

Diving beetle conservation
The greatest threat to diving beetles is the degradation and disappearance of their habitats due to anthropogenic activities. For example, urbanisation has led to the decreasing quantity and quality of dytiscid habitats, which consequentially has increased the distance between habitats. Thus, dytiscids may be exposed to high predation risks during dispersal.

Dytiscid adults are eaten by many birds, mammals, reptiles, and other vertebrate predators, despite their arsenal of chemical defenses. But by far the most important predator of diving beetles are fish, which limit the occurrence of most diving beetle species to fishless ponds, or to margins of aquatic habitats. Although the larvae of a few dytiscid species may become apex predators in small ponds, their presence is also often incompatible with fish. Therefore, the main focus of water beetle conservation is the protection of natural, fish-less habitats.
In the European Union, two species of diving beetles are protected by the Berne Convention on the Conservation of European Wildlife and Natural Habitats, and thus serve as umbrella species for the protection of natural aquatic habitats: Dytiscus latissimus and Graphoderus bilineatus.

Cultural significance
The diving beetle plays a role in a Cherokee creation story. According to the narrative, upon finding nowhere to rest in the "liquid chaos" the beetle brought up soft mud from the bottom. This mud then spread out to form all of the land on Earth.

Ethnobiology
Adult Dytiscidae, as well as Gyrinidae, are collected by young girls in East Africa. It is believed that inducing the beetles to bite the nipples will stimulate breast growth. The effect of that habit has not been tested, but it is notable that the defense glands of diving beetles contain many types of bioactive steroids.

Parasites
Dytiscidae are parasitised by various mites. Those in genera Dytiscacarus and Eylais live beneath the elytra of their hosts, those in genus Acherontacarus attach to the mesosternal regions and those in genus Hydrachna attach to various locations. These mites are parasitic as larvae with the exception of Dytiscacarus, which are parasitic for their entire life cycle.

Systematics 
The following taxonomic sequence gives the subfamilies, their associated genera.

Subfamily Agabinae Thomson, 1867
 Agabinus Crotch, 1873
 Agabus Leach, 1817
 Agametrus Sharp, 1882
 Andonectes Guéorguiev, 1971
 Hydronebrius Jakovlev, 1897
 Hydrotrupes Sharp, 1882
 Ilybiosoma Crotch, 1873
 Ilybius Erichson, 1832
 Leuronectes Sharp, 1882
 Platambus Thomson, 1859
 † Platynectes Régimbart, 1879

Subfamily Colymbetinae Erichson, 1837
 Anisomeria Brinck, 1943
 Senilites Brinck, 1948
 Carabdytes Balke, Hendrich & Wewalka, 1992
 Bunites Spangler, 1972
 Colymbetes Clairville, 1806
 Hoperius Fall, 1927
 Meladema Laporte, 1835
 Melanodytes Seidlitz, 1887
 Neoscutopterus J.Balfour-Browne, 1943
 Rhantus Dejean, 1833
 Rugosus García, 2001

Subfamily Copelatinae Branden, 1885
 Agaporomorphus Zimmermann, 1921
 Aglymbus Sharp, 1880
 Copelatus Erichson, 1832
 Exocelina Broun, 1886
 Lacconectus Motschulsky, 1855
 Liopterus Dejean, 1833
 Madaglymbus Shaverdo & Balke, 2008
 Rugosus García, 2001
Subfamily Coptotominae Branden, 1885
 Coptotomus Say, 1830
Subfamily Cybistrinae
 Austrodytes Watts, 1978
 Cybister Curtis, 1827
 Megadytes Sharp, 1882
 Onychohydrus Schaum & White, 1847
 Regimbartina Chatanay, 1911
 Spencerhydrus Sharp, 1882
 Sternhydrus Brinck, 1945
Subfamily Dytiscinae Leach, 1815

 Acilius Leach, 1817
 Aethionectes Sharp, 1882
 Austrodytes Watts, 1978
 Dytiscus Linnaeus, 1758
 Eretes Laporte, 1833
 Graphoderus Dejean, 1833
 Hydaticus Leach, 1817
 Hyderodes Hope, 1838
 Megadytes Sharp, 1882
 Miodytiscus Wickham, 1911
 Notaticus Zimmermann, 1928
 Onychohydrus Schaum & White, 1847
 Regimbartina Chatanay, 1911
 Rhantaticus Sharp, 1880
 Sandracottus Sharp, 1882
 Spencerhydrus Sharp, 1882
 Sternhydrus Brinck, 1945
 Thermonectus Dejean, 1833
 Tikoloshanes Omer-Cooper, 1956
 †Ambarticus  Yang et al. 2019 Burmese amber, Myanmar, Late Cretaceous (Cenomanian)

Subfamily Hydrodytinae K.B.Miller, 2001
 Hydrodytes K.B.Miller, 2001
 Microhydrodytes K.B.Miller, 2002
Subfamily Hydroporinae Aubé, 1836
 Africodytes Biström, 1988
 Agnoshydrus Biström, Nilsson & Wewalka, 1997
 Allodessus Guignot, 1953
 Allopachria Zimmermann, 1924
 Amarodytes Régimbart, 1900
 Amurodytes Fery & Petrov, 2013
 Andex Sharp, 1882
 Anginopachria Wewalka, Balke & Hendrich, 2001
 Anodocheilus Babington, 1841
 Antiporus Sharp, 1882
 Barretthydrus Lea, 1927
 Bidessodes Régimbart, 1895
 Bidessonotus Régimbart, 1895
 Bidessus Sharp, 1882
 Boreonectes Angus, 2010
 Borneodessus Balke, Hendrich, Mazzoldi & Biström, 2002
 Brachyvatus Zimmermann, 1919
 Brancuporus Hendrich, Toussaint & Balke, 2014
 Canthyporus Zimmermann, 1919
 Carabhydrus Watts, 1978
 Celina Aubé, 1837
 Chostonectes Sharp, 1880
 Clypeodytes Régimbart, 1894
 Coelhydrus Sharp, 1882
 Comaldessus Spangler & Barr, 1995
 Crinodessus K.B. Miller, 1997
 Darwinhydrus Sharp, 1882
 Deronectes Sharp, 1882
 Derovatellus Sharp, 1882
 Desmopachria Babington, 1841
 Dimitshydrus Uéno, 1996
 Ereboporus K.B. Miller, Gibson & Alarie, 2009
 Etruscodytes Mazza, Cianferoni & Rocchi, 2013
 Fontidessus K.B. Miller & Spangler, 2008
 Geodessus Brancucci, 1979
 Gibbidessus Watts, 1978
 Glareadessus Wewalka & Biström, 1998
 Graptodytes Seidlitz, 1887
 Haideoporus Young & Longley, 1976
 Hemibidessus Zimmermann, 1921
 Heroceras Guignot, 1949
 Herophydrus Sharp, 1880
 Heterhydrus Fairmaire, 1869
 Heterosternuta Strand, 1935
 Hovahydrus Biström, 1982
 Huxelhydrus Sharp, 1882
 Hydrocolus Roughley & Larson in Larson, Alarie & Roughley, 2000
 Hydrodessus J. Balfour-Browne, 1953
 Hydroglyphus Motschulsky, 1853
 Hydropeplus Sharp, 1882
 Hydroporus Clairville, 1806
 Hydrovatus Motschulsky, 1853
 Hygrotus Stephens, 1828
 Hyphoporus Sharp, 1880
 Hyphovatus Wewalka & Biström, 1994
 Hyphydrus Illiger, 1802
 Hypodessus Guignot, 1939
 Iberoporus Castro & Delgado, 2001
 Incomptodessus K.B. Miller & García, 2011
 Kakadudessus Hendrich & Balke, 2009
 Laccornellus Roughley & Wolfe, 1987
 Laccornis Gozis, 1914
 Leiodytes Guignot, 1936
 Limbodessus Guignot, 1939
 Liodessus Guignot, 1939
 Lioporeus Guignot, 1950
 Megaporus Brinck, 1943
 Metaporus Guignot, 1945
 Methles Sharp, 1882
 Microdessus Young, 1967
 Microdytes J. Balfour-Browne, 1946
 Morimotoa Uéno, 1957
 Nebrioporus Régimbart, 1906
 Necterosoma W.J. Macleay, 1871
 Neobidessodes Hendrich & Balke, 2009
 Neobidessus Young, 1967
 Neoclypeodytes Young, 1967
 Neoporus Guignot, 1931
 Oreodytes Seidlitz, 1887
 Pachydrus Sharp, 1882
 Pachynectes Régimbart, 1903
 Papuadessus Balke, 2001
 Paroster Sharp, 1882
 Peschetius Guignot, 1942
 Petrodessus K.B. Miller, 2012
 Phreatodessus Ordish, 1976
 Platydytes Biström, 1988
 Porhydrus Guignot, 1945
 Primospes Sharp, 1882
 Pseuduvarus Biström, 1988
 Psychopomporus Jean, Telles & K.B. Miller, 2012
 Pteroporus Guignot, 1933
 Queda Sharp, 1882
 Rhithrodytes Bameul, 1989
 Sanfilippodytes Franciscolo, 1979
 Scarodytes Gozis, 1914
 Schistomerus Palmer, 1957
 Sekaliporus Watts, 1997
 Sharphydrus Omer-Cooper, 1958
 Siamoporus Spangler, 1996
 Siettitia Abeille de Perrin, 1904
 Sinodytes Spangler, 1996
 Spanglerodessus K.B. Miller & García, 2011
 Sternopriscus Sharp, 1880
 Stictonectes Brinck, 1943
 Stictotarsus Zimmermann, 1919
 Stygoporus Larson & LaBonte, 1994
 Suphrodytes Gozis, 1914
 Tepuidessus Spangler, 1981
 Terradessus Watts, 1982
 Tiporus Watts, 1985
 Trichonectes Guignot, 1941
 Trogloguignotus Sanfilippo, 1958
 Tyndallhydrus Sharp, 1882
 Typhlodessus Brancucci, 1985
 Uvarus Guignot, 1939
 Vatellus Aubé, 1837
 Yola Gozis, 1886
 Yolina Guignot, 1936
 † Calicovatellus K.B. Miller & Lubkin, 2001
 † Kuschelydrus Ordish, 1976
 † Procoelambus Théobald, 1937

Subfamily Laccophilinae Gistel, 1856
 Africophilus Guignot, 1948
 Agabetes Crotch, 1873
 Australphilus Watts, 1978
 Japanolaccophilus Satô, 1972
 Laccodytes Régimbart, 1895
 Laccophilus Leach, 1815
 Laccoporus J. Balfour-Browne, 1939
 Laccosternus Brancucci, 1983
 Napodytes Steiner, 1981
 Neptosternus Sharp, 1882
 Philaccolilus Guignot, 1937
 Philaccolus Guignot, 1937
 Philodytes J. Balfour-Browne, 1939

Subfamily Lancetinae Branden, 1885
 Lancetes Sharp, 1882
Subfamily Matinae Branden, 1885
 Allomatus Mouchamps, 1964
 Batrachomatus Clark, 1863
 Matus Aubé, 1836
Subfamily †Liadytiscinae Prokin & Ren, 2010
 † Liadroporus Prokin & Ren, 2010 Yixian Formation, China, Early Cretaceous (Aptian)
 † Liadytiscus Prokin & Ren, 2010 Yixian Formation, China, Aptian
 † Mesoderus Prokin & Ren, 2010 Yixian Formation, China, Aptian
 † Liadyxianus Prokin, Petrov, B. Wang & Ponomarenko, 2013 Yixian Formation, China, Aptian
 † Mesodytes Prokin, Petrov, Wang & Ponomarenko, 2013 Yixian Formation, China, Aptian
Subfamily Incertae sedis
 † Cretodytes Ponomarenko, 1977 Doronino Formation, Russia, Early Cretaceous (Barremian), Kzyl-Zhar, Kazakhstan, Late Cretaceous (Turonian)
 † Palaeodytes Ponomarenko, 1987 Karabastau Formation, Kazakhstan, Late Jurassic (Oxfordian), Durlston Formation, United Kingdom, Early Cretaceous (Berriasian), Zaza Formation, Russia, Aptian
 † Sinoporus Prokin & Ren, 2010 Yixian Formation, China, Aptian

References 

  (2004): Water for a Healthy Country - Family Dytiscidae. Version of 2004-JUL-02. Retrieved 2008-AUG-04
  (2002): Chapter 26 - Eastern Asia: China, Japan, and other countries. In: The Human Use of Insects as a Food Resource:  A Bibliographic Account in Progress.
  (2003): Fried water beetles Cantonese style. American Entomologist 49(1): 34-37. PDF fulltext
  (2000): Predaceous Diving Beetles (Coleoptera: Dytiscidae) of the Nearctic Region, with emphasis on the fauna of Canada and Alaska. NRC Research Press, Ottawa. .

External links 

 
 

 
Beetle families
Aquatic insects